Jeremiah Isaiah Valoaga (born November 15, 1994) is an American football defensive end for the Memphis Showboats of the United States Football League (USFL). He played college football at UNLV, and was signed by the Detroit Lions as an undrafted free agent in 2017.

Early life
Valoaga was born in Oxnard, CA. He graduated from Channel Islands High School in 2012. He is of Samoan descent.

College statistics

Professional career

Detroit Lions
Valoaga signed with the Detroit Lions as an undrafted free agent on May 12, 2017. On September 24, 2017, he recorded the first sack of his NFL career during a 26–30 loss against the Atlanta Falcons. On November 25, 2017, Valoaga was waived by the Lions and was re-signed to the practice squad. He signed a reserve/future contract with the Lions on January 1, 2018.

On August 31, 2018, Valoaga was waived by the Lions.

Miami Dolphins
On September 26, 2018, Valoaga was signed to the Miami Dolphins' practice squad. He signed a reserve/future contract with the Dolphins on January 1, 2019. On May 1, 2019, the Dolphins waived Valoaga.

San Francisco 49ers
On August 8, 2019, Valoaga was signed by the San Francisco 49ers. In the preseason, Valoaga led the 49ers in sacks. He was waived on August 31, 2019 and was signed to the practice squad the next day. He was promoted to the active roster on November 25, 2019. He was waived on December 23, 2019.

Oakland / Las Vegas Raiders
On December 24, 2019, Valoaga was claimed off waivers by the Oakland Raiders.

Valoaga re-signed on a one-year exclusive-rights free agent contract with the Las Vegas Raiders on April 17, 2020. He chose to opt-out of the 2020 season due to the COVID-19 pandemic on August 3, 2020. He was waived after the season on March 1, 2021.

New York Jets
On July 27, 2021, Valoaga signed with the New York Jets. He was waived on August 31, 2021.

Tampa Bay Bandits
Valoaga signed with the Tampa Bay Bandits of the United States Football League on June 11, 2022, and was subsequently transferred to the team's inactive roster.

Memphis Showboats
Valoaga and all other Tampa Bay Bandits players were all transferred to the Memphis Showboats after it was announced that the Bandits were taking a hiatus and that the Showboats were joining the league.

References

External links
Detroit Lions bio
UNLV Rebels bio

1994 births
Living people
American sportspeople of Samoan descent
American football defensive ends
Sportspeople from Oxnard, California
Players of American football from California
UNLV Rebels football players
Detroit Lions players
Miami Dolphins players
San Francisco 49ers players
Oakland Raiders players
Las Vegas Raiders players
New York Jets players
Tampa Bay Bandits (2022) players